Haghpat is a village in the Lori Province of Armenia, located near the city of Alaverdi and the state border with Georgia.

It is notable for Haghpat Monastery, a religious complex founded in the 10th century and included in the UNESCO World Heritage List along with monasteries in nearby Sanahin. The monastery is a magnificent example of medieval Armenian architecture that has been attracting increasing numbers of tourists.

Haghpat Monastery is listed among the UNESCO World Heritage List (1996).

The village lies on a dissected plateau, a large flat area dissected by deep "cracks" formed by rivers, including the river Debed. The villages of Sanahin and Akner, as well as a part of Alaverdi, lie in plain view on neighbouring sections of the plateau, however a steep and long descent to and ascent from the river is required to travel to them.

Gallery

See also
Sanahin

References

External links

 Armeniapedia Haghpat article
 Photos of Haghpat Monastery
 Haghpat Monastery - photo essay at HitchHikers Handbook

Populated places in Lori Province